D-Cru was a Canadian R&B music group formed in Vancouver, consisting of singers Nicole Hutton, Tito Chipman, Craig Smart, Damien Kyles and Aimee Mackenzie.

Career
They released their self-titled debut album, D-Cru in 2000. The album featured their biggest hit, the ballad "I Will Be Waiting", a top-ten hit in Canada. The album's other main single on the Canadian charts (reaching number 11 and remaining on the charts for six months) was "Show Me", which sampled the chorus from the song "Show Me the Way", which was originally a hit for Mackenzie's old group The West End Girls in 1991.

D-Cru band member Craig Smart later contributed back-up vocals on two tracks for Master P's album Game Face.

They received a Juno Award nomination in 2001 for Best R&B/Soul Recording for "I Will Be Waiting".

Discography

Studio albums
The Outer World (1998)
Into the Future (2002)

Singles

References

Musical collectives
Canadian pop music groups
Canadian contemporary R&B musical groups
Canadian dance music groups
Musical groups established in 1998
1998 establishments in British Columbia